Khurai may refer to

 Khurai, a city in Madhya Pradesh, India
 Khurai (Madhya Pradesh Vidhan Sabha constituency), the state legislative assembly constituency encompassing the city.
 Khurai (Manipur Vidhan Sabha constituency), a legislative assembly constituency of Manipur, India.